Tawngbohla is a village in Homalin Township, Hkamti District, in the Sagaing Region of northwestern Burma. It is located east of Mongkun.

References

External links
Maplandia World Gazetteer

Populated places in Hkamti District
Homalin Township